The Hong Kong Film Award for Best Sound Design is an award presented annually at the Hong Kong Film Awards for a film with the best sound design. As of 2016 the current winners are Kinson Tsang, George Yiu-Keung Lee and Chun Hin Yiu for The Taking of Tiger Mountain.

Winners and nominees

References

External links
 Hong Kong Film Awards Official Site

Hong Kong Film Awards